Heritage Bank may refer to:

 Heritage Bank, an Australian mutual bank
 Heritage Bank (Kentucky), an American bank with branches in Northern Kentucky
 Heritage Bank Center
 Heritage Banking Company Limited, a Nigerian commercial bank

See also
 Key Bank Center, also known as the Heritage Bank Building